An integral, or intrinsic, membrane protein (IMP)  is a type of membrane protein that is permanently attached to the biological membrane. All transmembrane proteins are IMPs, but not all IMPs are transmembrane proteins. IMPs comprise a significant fraction of the proteins encoded in an organism's genome. Proteins that cross the membrane are surrounded by annular lipids, which are defined as lipids that are in direct contact with a membrane protein. Such proteins can only be separated from the membranes by using detergents, nonpolar solvents, or sometimes denaturing agents.

Structure
Three-dimensional structures of ~160 different integral membrane proteins have been determined at atomic resolution by X-ray crystallography or nuclear magnetic resonance spectroscopy. They are challenging subjects for study owing to the difficulties associated with extraction and crystallization. In addition, structures of many water-soluble protein domains of IMPs are available in the Protein Data Bank. Their membrane-anchoring α-helices have been removed to facilitate the extraction and crystallization. Search integral membrane proteins in the PDB (based on gene ontology classification)

IMPs can be divided into two groups:

 Integral polytopic proteins (Transmembrane proteins)
 Integral monotopic proteins

Integral polytopic protein

The most common type of IMP is the transmembrane protein (TM), which spans the entire biological membrane. Single-pass membrane proteins cross the membrane only once, while multi-pass membrane proteins weave in and out, crossing several times. Single pass TM proteins can be categorized as Type I, which are positioned such that their carboxyl-terminus is towards the cytosol, or Type II, which have their amino-terminus towards the cytosol. Type III proteins have multiple transmembrane domains in a single polypeptide, while type IV consists of several different polypeptides assembled together in a channel through the membrane. Type V proteins are anchored to the lipid bilayer through covalently linked lipids. Finally Type VI proteins have both transmembrane domains and lipid anchors.

Integral monotopic proteins

Integral monotopic proteins are associated with the membrane from one side but do not span the lipid bilayer completely.

Determination of protein structure
The Protein Structure Initiative (PSI), funded by the U.S. National Institute of General Medical Sciences (NIGMS), part of the National Institutes of Health (NIH), has among its aim to determine three-dimensional protein structures and to develop techniques for use in structural biology, including for membrane proteins. Homology modeling can be used to construct an atomic-resolution model of the "target" integral protein from its amino acid sequence and an experimental three-dimensional structure of a related homologous protein. This procedure has been extensively used for ligand-G protein–coupled receptors (GPCR) and their complexes.

Function
IMPs include transporters, linkers, channels, receptors, enzymes, structural membrane-anchoring domains, proteins involved in accumulation and transduction of energy, and proteins responsible for cell adhesion. Classification of transporters can be found in Transporter Classification Database.

As an example of the relationship between the IMP (in this case the bacterial phototrapping pigment, bacteriorhodopsin) and the membrane formed by the phospholipid bilayer is illustrated below. In this case the integral membrane protein spans the phospholipid bilayer seven times. The part of the protein that is embedded in the hydrophobic regions of the bilayer are alpha helical and composed of predominantly hydrophobic amino acids. The C terminal end of the protein is in the cytosol while the N terminal region is in the outside of the cell. A membrane that contains this particular protein is able to function in photosynthesis.

Examples
Examples of integral membrane proteins:

Insulin receptor
Some types of cell adhesion proteins or cell adhesion molecules (CAMs) such as integrins, cadherins, NCAMs, or selectins
Some types of receptor proteins
Glycophorin
Rhodopsin
Band 3
CD36
Glucose Permease
Ion channels and Gates
Gap junction Proteins
G protein coupled receptors (e.g., Beta-adrenergic receptor)
Seipin

See also
Membrane protein
Transmembrane protein
Peripheral membrane protein
Annular lipid shell
Hydrophilicity plot
Inner nuclear membrane protein

References

Protein structure